Tatyana Shchelkanova (18 April 1937 – 24 November 2011) was a Soviet long jumper, sprinter and pentathlete who won a bronze medal in the long jump at the 1964 Olympics. In 1961 she set a world record at 6.48 m and extended it to 6.53 m in 1962 to and 6.70 m in 1964. However, in the Olympic final she only managed 6.42 m, while the winner Mary Rand broke the world record at 6.76 m. Shchelkanova won two European titles in the long jump, in 1962 and 1966 (indoor).

Shchelkanova won five gold (long jump in 1961, 1963 and 1965; 100 m in 1961; and pentathlon in 1965) and one silver medal (80 hurdles in 1963) at the Summer Universiade, as well as 10 national titles in the long jump (1961–66), 4 × 100 m relay (1961-63), and pentathlon (1963). After retiring from competitions she headed a department at the St. Petersburg State University of Telecommunications.

References

External links
Tatyana Shchelkanova's obituary

1937 births
2011 deaths
Russian female long jumpers
Russian heptathletes
Soviet female long jumpers
Soviet heptathletes
Burevestnik (sports society) athletes
Olympic bronze medalists for the Soviet Union
Athletes (track and field) at the 1964 Summer Olympics
Olympic athletes of the Soviet Union
European Athletics Championships medalists
Medalists at the 1964 Summer Olympics
Olympic bronze medalists in athletics (track and field)
Universiade medalists in athletics (track and field)
Universiade gold medalists for the Soviet Union
Universiade silver medalists for the Soviet Union
Medalists at the 1961 Summer Universiade
Medalists at the 1963 Summer Universiade
Medalists at the 1965 Summer Universiade